Roman Eduardovich Minayev (born 24 December 1997) is a Russian football player. He plays for FC Ufa.

Club career
He made his debut in the Russian Professional Football League for FC Avangard Kursk on 20 July 2016 in a game against FC Energomash Belgorod. He made his Russian Football National League debut for Avangard on 22 July 2017 in a game against PFC Krylia Sovetov Samara.

On 4 February 2020, he signed a 2.5-year contract with Russian Premier League club FC Arsenal Tula. He made his Russian Premier League debut for the club on 20 June 2020 in a game against FC Spartak Moscow.

On 28 June 2021, he moved to FC Rotor Volgograd.

References

External links
 
 
 
 Profile by Russian Professional Football League

1997 births
Sportspeople from Kursk
Living people
Russian footballers
Association football forwards
FC Avangard Kursk players
FC Arsenal Tula players
FC Tambov players
FC Rotor Volgograd players
FC Ufa players
Russian Premier League players
Russian First League players
Russian Second League players